Pediana is a genus of huntsman spiders that was first described by Eugène Louis Simon in 1880.

Species
 it contains nine species, found in Australia and on Java:
Pediana horni (Hogg, 1896) – Australia
Pediana longbottomi Hirst, 1996 – Australia (Western Australia)
Pediana mainae Hirst, 1995 – Australia (Northern Territory)
Pediana occidentalis Hogg, 1903 – Australia (Western Australia, South Australia)
Pediana paradoxa Hirst, 1996 – Australia (South Australia)
Pediana regina (L. Koch, 1875) (type) – Australia (Western Australia, Queensland, New South Wales)
Pediana temmei Hirst, 1996 – Australia (South Australia)
Pediana tenuis Hogg, 1903 – Australia (Western Australia, South Australia)
Pediana webberae Hirst, 1996 – Australia (Northern Territory)

See also
 List of Sparassidae species

References

Araneomorphae genera
Sparassidae
Spiders of Asia
Spiders of Australia